Tanmoy Bhattacharya is a former Member of the Legislative Assembly for Dum Dum Uttar.

References

External links

Bengali Hindus
Ramakrishna Mission schools alumni
Indian politicians
1958 births
Living people
West Bengal MLAs 2016–2021
Baranagore Ramakrishna Mission Ashrama High School alumni
People from Baranagar
Communist Party of India (Marxist) politicians from West Bengal
Politicians from Kolkata
21st-century Indian politicians